Wharton Follies is a student organization in the MBA program at the Wharton School of the University of Pennsylvania that puts on an annual amateur musical theater production. Started in 1977, it is both one of the largest clubs and highest profile organizations at Wharton, staging one of the largest productions of its kind at any professional school. Over the years, Follies has been transformed into a Broadway-level production boasting a six-figure budget and with successive producers and directors building on their predecessor's accomplishments. Follies typically features prominent members of the administration (e.g., dean, vice dean, and admissions director), popular faculty members, and fellow classmates. The show typically makes fun of the Wharton experience, other business schools, and students who have made a name for themselves. One student said that part of the appeal of Follies is that it “show[s] off student talent that you wouldn’t otherwise be able to witness.”

Follies Videos
In addition to a live stage show featuring the school's most talented students, Follies writes, shoots, and edits its own Saturday Night Live-style video features for public consumption. The videos treat typical business school topics in a humorous fashion. Recent topics have included "The Evolution of an MBA," "Drunken Case History," "MBAs Assemble a Malm Bed," "Jawn of the Dead," and "Professors Read Mean Reviews." The last, which is a take on Jimmy Kimmel Live's "Celebrities Read Mean Tweets," is especially notable, with over 200,000 views.

Past Performances
 2023 21 Walnut Street
 2022 Follies' 11
 2021 Wizard of Lolz
 2020 Follies Angels
 2018 WTV: Wharton Network
 2017 Saved by the Follies
 2016 Back to  the Follies (40th Annual Wharton Follies)
 2015 The Huntsman Hangover
 2014 The Book of Wharton
 2013 It's a Whartonful Life
 2012 How to Succeed in Business School Without Really Trying
 2011 Assets and Liabilities: The Parable of Your Personal Brand
 2010 The 34th Annual Follies Awards: It's a Dishonor Just to be Nominated
 2009 The Trojan Wharton: A Greek Comedy About a Financial Tragedy
 2008 A Midsemester Night's Dream
 2007 D’Anjani Code
 2006 Springtime for Harker
 2005 Fast Times at Huntsman High
 2004 Whatchu Talkin’ Bout Anjani?
 2003 Dial 5 For Wharton
 2002 Crouching Market Hidden Offer
 2001 All's Fair in Love and Wharton
 2000 The VC Who Loved Me... A Dotcomedy
 1999 There's Something About Gerrity
 1998 Hey! Get Your Hands Outta My Vance!
 1997 The Trea$ury Hunt
 1996 Mission Improbable
 1995 Heaven Can Waitlist
 1994 As Wharton Turns
 1993 CLUEless, or Death of a Curriculum
 1992 The Wharton Television Network
 1991 Alice in Whartonland
 1990 Willy Wharton and the MBA Factory
 1989 Follies the Thirteenth
 1988 Between the Balance Sheets
 1987 Publish and Perish
 1986 Yield to Maturity
 1985 Retained Yearnings
 1984 Big Deal: A Dramatic Offering
 1983 ET – The Economy's Terrible
 1982 Pirates of Penn Vance
 1981 Ain’t Calculatin’
 1980 Vancin’
 1979 Shall We Vance?
 1978 Harry, Is This Wharton?
 1977 A Placement Line

References

Wharton School of the University of Pennsylvania